Divine is the third studio album by American post-punk band Tuxedomoon, released in 1982 by Operation Twilight. The music is based on the ballet of the same name by Maurice Béjart. The album was issued on CD in 1990 by Cramboy with an expanded track listing.

Track listing

Personnel 
Adapted from the Divine liner notes.

Tuxedomoon
 Steven Brown – saxophone, clarinet, keyboards, lead vocals
 Peter Dachert (as Peter Principle) – bass guitar, guitar, keyboards, drum programming, tape, lead vocals
 Blaine L. Reininger – violin, viola, keyboards, lead vocals

Additional musicians
 Bruce Geduldig – drums and lead vocals (B1)
 Winston Tong – piano and lead vocals (A1)
Production and additional personnel
 Saskia Lupini – cover art
 Gilles Martin – recording
 Tuxedomoon – production

Release history

References

External links 
 

1982 albums
Tuxedomoon albums
Les Disques du Crépuscule albums